AnyLogic is a multimethod simulation modeling tool developed by The AnyLogic Company (formerly XJ Technologies). It supports agent-based, discrete event, and system dynamics simulation methodologies. AnyLogic is cross-platform simulation software that works on Windows, macOS and Linux.
AnyLogic is used to simulate: markets and competition, healthcare, manufacturing, supply chains and logistics, retail, business processes, social and ecosystem dynamics, defense, project and asset management, pedestrian dynamics and road traffic, IT, and aerospace.

History of AnyLogic
At the beginning of the 1990s, there was a big interest in the mathematical approach to modeling and simulation of parallel processes. This approach may be applied to the analysis of correctness of parallel and distributed programs. The Distributed Computer Network (DCN) research group at Saint Petersburg Polytechnic University developed a software system for the analysis of program correctness; the new tool was named COVERS (Concurrent Verification and Simulation). This system allowed graphical modeling notation to be used for describing system structure and behavior. The tool was developed with the help of a research grant from Hewlett-Packard (Commonly known as HP).

In 1998 the success of this research inspired the DCN laboratory to organize a company with the mission of developing a new generation of simulation software. Development emphasis was placed on applied methods: simulation, performance analysis, behavior of stochastic systems, optimization and visualization. The resulting software was released in 2000 and featured the latest information technologies: an object-oriented approach, elements of the UML standard, the use of Java, and a modern GUI. 

The tool was named AnyLogic, because it supported all three well-known modeling approaches: system dynamics, discrete event simulation, Agent-based modeling. and any combination of these approaches within a single model. The first version of AnyLogic was V4, because the numbering continues the numbering of COVERS 3.0.

AnyLogic 5 was released in 2003. New version was focused on business simulation in different industries. AnyLogic 7 was released in 2014. It featured many updates aimed at simplifying model building, including support for multimethod modeling, a decreased need for coding, renewed libraries, and other usability improvements. AnyLogic 7.1, also released in 2014, included a new GIS implementation: in addition to shapefile-based maps, AnyLogic started to support tile maps from free online providers, including OpenStreetMap.

2015 marked the release of AnyLogiс 7.2 with the built-in database and the Fluid Library. Since 2015, AnyLogic Personal Learning Edition (PLE) is available for free for the purposes of education and self-education. The PLE license is perpetual, but created models are limited in size.

The new Road Traffic Library was introduced in 2016 with AnyLogic 7.3.

AnyLogic 8 was released in 2017. Beginning with Version 8.0, the AnyLogic model development environment was integrated with AnyLogic Cloud, a web service for simulation analytics. 

The platform for AnyLogic 8 model development environment is Eclipse.

AnyLogic and Java

AnyLogic includes a graphical modeling language and also allows the user to extend simulation models with Java code. The Java nature of AnyLogic lends itself to custom model extensions via Java coding

AnyLogic Cloud

AnyLogic Cloud is a web service for simulation analytics. It allows users to store, access, run, and share simulation models online, as well as analyze experiment results.

Using AnyLogic model development environment, developers can upload their models to AnyLogic Cloud and set up sharable web dashboards to work with models online. These dashboards can contain configurable input parameters and output data in the form of charts and graphs. Model users can set input data on the dashboard screen, run the model, and analyze the output.

AnyLogic Cloud allows users to run models using web browsers, on desktop computers and mobile devices, with the model being executed on the server side. Multiple run experiments are performed using several nodes. The results of all executed experiments are stored in the database and can be immediately accessed. Models can be run both with and without HTML5-based interactive animation.

Developers can choose whether they want their models to be private or publicly available in the model library, which includes models from other AnyLogic users.

anyLogistix supply chain optimization software 

The AnyLogic Company converted its development efforts for the supply chain domain in a separate software tool – anyLogistix. This spin-off product was introduced in 2014 as AnyLogic Logistics Network Manager and was renamed anyLogistix in 2015.

anyLogistix is based on the AnyLogic and CPLEX engines, GIS, and the new industry-oriented GUI. It also includes algorithms and techniques specific for supply chain design and optimization. Like other simulation software such as Arena and SIMUL8, optimization functionality is provided by OptQuest. anyLogistix is fully integrated with AnyLogic, for instance, AnyLogic can be used for customization of objects inside anyLogistix, including warehouses, production sites, suppliers, inventory, sourcing, and transportation policies.

See also 
 Comparison of agent-based modeling software
 List of computer simulation software
 List of discrete event simulation software
 Computer simulation

References

Further reading

External links 

 

Simulation software
Traffic simulation
Java development tools
Science software for macOS
Science software for Windows
Science software for Linux
Agent-based software
2000 software